National Mobilization Law was legislated in the National People's Congress (NPC) of the People's Republic of China on 26 February 2010. The law gives the NPC Standing Committee the power to put the national economy and civilians in China, including foreign assets, in war-time footing if "state sovereignty, unification, territorial integrity or security is threatened."< The law went into effect on 1 July 2010.

See also
Mobilization

Notes

External links

 Full text of the National Mobilization Law 中华人民共和国国防动员法（全文） China News Service Feb 26, 2010

Military of the People's Republic of China
Chinese law
Military economics
Military logistics
Civilians in war
Foreign relations of China
2010 in China
2010 in law